The White Lady is a rock painting, located on a panel, also depicting other art work, on a small rock overhang, deep within Brandberg Mountain. The giant granite monolith located in Damaraland and called 'The Brandberg' is Namibia's highest mountain. The painting's German name is Weiße Dame.

The painting has long been an archaeological dilemma, and several different hypotheses have been put forth on its origins, authorship and dating. It is now usually accepted to be a bushmen painting, dating back at least 2000 years ago.

Location and description

The "White Lady" archaeological site is located close to the road from Khorixas to Hentie's Bay, in the area of Uis, on the Brandberg Massif. The Brandberg itself hosts over 1.000 bushmen paintings, scattered around in rock shelters and caves. The "White Lady Group" is found in a cave known as "Maack Shelter" and portrays several human figures as well as oryxes, on a rock panel measuring about 5.5 m x 1.5 m. The "White Lady" is the most detailed human figure in the group, and measures about 39.5 cm x 29 cm. To reach The White Lady it is necessary to hike for about 45-60 minutes over rough terrain, along the gorge of the normally dry Tsisab river.

It is usually assumed that the painting shows some sort of ritual dance, and that the "White Lady" is a shaman. She has white legs and arms, which may suggest that her body was painted or that she was wearing some sort of decorative attachments on her legs and arms. She holds a bow in one hand and perhaps a goblet in the other. Because of the bow and the oryxes, the painting has also been interpreted as a hunting scene. Apart from the shaman/lady, the other human figures have less detail, and are mostly completely black or completely white. One of the oryxes has human legs. The painting was probably made of ochre, charcoal, manganese, hematite, with blood serum, egg white, and casein used as binding agents.

The painting has undergone severe damage since it was first discovered in the early 20th century. For a few decades, tourists would pour water on the painting to make the colors more clearly visible, causing the painting to fade quickly. The site is now a protected heritage site of Namibia, and visiting is only permitted with official guides. For the protection of the art, bags and bottles are not allowed at the far end of the trail.

Because of tourist protests, the metal wire netting has been replaced by only two metal bars, for a much better view.

Finding and interpretation controversy

The White Lady was first discovered in 1918 by German explorer and topographer Reinhard Maack as he was surveying the Brandberg. Maack was impressed by the main figure of the painting, which he described as "a warrior". In his notes, he wrote that "the Egyptian-Mediterranean style of all the figures is surprising". He made several hand-drawn copies of the painting, which were later published in Europe.

In 1929, Maack's notes came into the hands of the well-known French anthropologist Henri Breuil while he was visiting Cape Town. Breuil noted analogies between the White Lady and paintings of athletes found in Knossos (Crete), and suggested that the Brandberg might have been visited by a group of travelers coming from the Mediterranean area. It was Breuil who first referred to the painting as "the white lady". In 1945 Breuil could finally visit the White Lady site, and published his theories on the Mediterranean origin of the painting first in South Africa and then in Europe.

Breuil's arguments were influential of several later hypotheses concerning the painting, some of which suggested that it could be Phoenician in origin.

In the second half of the 20th century, most theories on Mediterranean influences on the ancient history of subsaharan Africa (like those about Great Zimbabwe being "non-African" in origin) were gradually dismissed.

Notes

References
 Henri Breuil, (1948) The White Lady of the Brandberg: Her Companions and Her Guards, «South African Archaeological Bulletin»
 Henri Breuil et al. (1955), The White Lady of the Brandberg. Faber & Faber, New York.
 Clive Cowley, Journey into Namibia
 Basil Davidson (1963), Old Africa Rediscovered.
 Credo Mutwa (1991), Indaba: La favolosa storia delle genti africane. Red.
 Namibia 1 on 1, The White Lady of the Brandberg
 Hugo Obermaier, Herbert Kühn: Buschmannkunst. Felsmalereien aus Südwestafrika. Schmidt & Gunther, Leipzig. (1930)

Rock art in Africa
Archaeological sites in Namibia
1918 archaeological discoveries
Archaeology of Southern Africa
Archaeological sites of Southern Africa
Archaeological history of Southern Africa
Pseudoarchaeology
Archaeology and racism